Mulawin vs. Ravena is a 2017 Philippine television drama fantasy series broadcast by GMA Network. The series served as a sequel to the 2004 Philippine television series Mulawin and the 2005 Philippine film Mulawin: The Movie. Directed by Dominic Zapata and Don Michael Perez, it stars Dennis Trillo. It premiered on May 22, 2017 on the network's Telebabad line up replacing Encantadia. The series concluded on September 15, 2017 with a total of 85 episodes. It was replaced by Alyas Robin Hood in its timeslot.

The series is streaming online on YouTube.

Premise
Ever since Ravena's breakaway from Avian, Mulawin and Ravena have been at war, fighting against each other over humans. Both have had histories of love affairs with humans, which resulted to half-blood offspring. The dilution of their race has made Mulawins and Ravenas mortal like humans. The desire for immortality leads to the next chapter of the Mulawin-Ravena war.

Cast and characters

Lead cast
 Dennis Trillo as Gabriel Montenegro - son of Ravenum and Alwina's childhood friend.
 Heart Evangelista as Alwina - Gabriel's childhood friend and the mother of Almiro and Tak.
 Lovi Poe as Magindara - daughter of Sandawa and Mandarangan.
 Carla Abellana as Aviona - Rodrigo's wife and Anya's mother.
 Miguel Tanfelix as Pagaspas / Gas / Paggy / Bogart - Lawiswis' childhood friend and Lourdes' adoptive son.
 Bianca Umali as Lawiswis / Wis / Emily - Tuka's adoptive daughter and Pagaspas' childhood friend.
 Kiko Estrada as Rafael Montenegro - Savanna's son.
 Bea Binene as Anya Manalastas - daughter of Aviona and Rodrigo.
 Derrick Monasterio as Almiro / Rodrigo Manalastas - son of Alwina and Aguiluz.

Supporting cast
 Regine Velasquez as Sandawa - Mandarangan's wife and the mother of Magindara, Lumad and Dakila. The guardian of Eden and the Balasik.
 Roi Vinzon as Daragit - a Mulawin and member of the Council of Elders.
 Ariel Rivera as Panabon - half Mulawin.
 Chynna Ortaleza as Rashana - Gabriel's wife, Wak's mother and Tak's stepmother.
 TJ Trinidad as Greco - Gabriel's right-hand man.
 Martin del Rosario as Aramis - Lourdes' son.
 Dion Ignacio as Siklab / Tayag - son of Vultra and Daragit.
 Wynwyn Marquez as Ribay - Rashana's right-hand woman.
 Valerie Concepcion as Tuka - Lawiswis' adoptive mother.
 JC Tiuseco as Tangos - Daragit's henchman.
 Juan Rodrigo as tandang Lumbas - eldest of the Mulawins.
 Shermaine Santiago as Maningning - leader of the Tagubas.
 Joey Paras as Dakdak - leader of the Periko tribe.
 David Licauco as Malik - Anya, Lawiswis, Pagaspas, and Almiro's childhood friend.
 Angelu De Leon as Lourdes - Pagaspas and Alwina's adoptive human mother and Aramis' mother.
 Bobby Andrews as Dionisio - member of the Lumad group.
 Joko Diaz as Antonio - Savanna's accomplice.
 Charee Pineda as Savannah Montenegro - Rafael's mother.
 Dexter Doria as Rosing - a human member of the Council of Elders.
 Nova Villa as Consuelo "Elo" Manalastas - Almiro's adoptive human mother and Rodrigo's mother.

Recurring cast
 Seth dela Cruz as Uwak-ak "Wak" - Rashana and Gabriel's son.
 Caprice Cayetano as Tagaktak "Tak" - Alwina and Gabriel's daughter.

Guest cast
 Tom Rodriguez as Rodrigo - Aviona's husband
 Leanne Bautista as young Anya
 Dentrix Ponce as young Almiro
 Marc Justin Alvarez as young Pagaspas
 Althea Ablan as young Lawiswis
 Josh Clement Eugenio as young Rafael
 Geson Grenado as young Malik
 John Feir as Banoy - leader of the Très Avés.
 Jeff Carpio as Laab - leader of the Musang tribe.
 Bryan Benedict as Ningas - Siklab's friend.
 Kirst Viray as Ronnie - Savanna's servant.
 Jordan Hong as Sandro
 Elle Ramirez as Uyak - Tangos' wife.
 Ashley Cabrera as Tisay
 Carlon Matobato as Balatkayo
 Froilan Sales as Bagyo
 Victoria Quinn as Silayan
 Mike Lloren as Diosdado - Dionisio's father.
 Ollie Espino as Amang - Malik's father.
 Kristofer Martin as Libero - Lagrimas' son.
 Lharby Policarpio as Pakdaw - soldier in Avila and captain of Sipakbul fest.
 Sherilyn Reyes-Tan as Lagrimas, mother of Libero.
 Mega Unciano as Periko - Dakdak's friend. 
 Paolo Gumabao as Ryan - Rafael's rival for Marga.
 Jazz Ocampo as Marga - Rafael's crush.
 B Delgado as Patty - a Tabon.
 Angela Evangelista as Riya - friend of Patty.
 Krisha Kae Francisco as Oyayi - member of the Taguba tribe.
 Ayra Mariano as Selda - Lumbas' daughter.
 Ameera Johara as Langay - member of Tres Aves.
 Yasser Marta as Palong - member of Tres Aves.
 Vince Gamad as Kalaw - member of Tres Aves.
 Kenken Nuyad as Lazcano - leader of the Scout group.
 Jacob Briz as scout member - member of the Scout group.
 Glaiza de Castro as Pirena - a fairy from Encantadia.
 Mikee Quintos as Lira - niece of Pirena.
 Pekto as Simeon - Bogart's adoptive father.
 Joanna Marie Katanyag as Adora - Bogart's adoptive mother.
 Lianne Valentin as Shiela
 Maureen Larrazabal as Belinda - Shiela's mother.
 Will Ashley de Leon as adult Wak
 Ayeesha Martinez as adult Tak

The cast of Mulawin (2004) and Mulawin: The Movie (2005) including Richard Gutierrez, Angel Locsin, Michael de Mesa, Gary Estrada, Romnick Sarmienta, Bianca King, Sam Bumatay, Miguel Tanfelix, Amy Austria, Eddie Gutierrez, Zoren Legaspi, Karen delos Reyes, Nicole Anderson, Paolo Contis and Boy2 Quizon appeared in archived footage.

Production

Development
The first appearance of the Mulawin in 12 years occurred in Encantadia (2016) starring Miguel Tanfelix as Pagaspas, the same actor who portrayed the same character in 2004. It was followed by a guest appearance of Alden Richards in the same series as Lakan. In Encantadia (2005), the Mulawins also made several appearances including Avilan, the leader of the Mulawins serving as a spirit guide to Amihan. The show was announced during GMA Network's New Year Countdown, with the official title as Mulawin vs. Ravena as part of the network's line-up in 2017.

Casting
In November 2016, Popoy Caritativo, manager of actor Dennis Trillo posted an Instagram photo regarding his meeting with GMA Network executives including Cheryl Ching-Sy, AVP for Drama regarding the sequel of the hit 2004 series, Mulawin. Trillo was also present in the said meeting which was later revealed to topbill the upcoming series, in a yet to be determined role. In December 2016, Alden Richards and Miguel Tanfelix who both appeared in Encantadia (2016) as Lakan and Pagaspas respectively were also announced to be part of show. On January 16, 2017, more cast members were announced which included Regine Velasquez. Dennis Trillo and Miguel Tanfelix reprised their roles from the 2004 television series and 2005 film as Gabriel and Pagaspas respectively.

Ratings
According to AGB Nielsen Philippines' Nationwide Urban Television Audience Measurement People in television homes, the pilot episode of Mulawin vs. Ravena earned a 12.2% rating. While the final episode scored an 8.9% rating.

Accolades

References

External links
 
 

2017 Philippine television series debuts
2017 Philippine television series endings
Encantadia
Mulawin
Fantaserye and telefantasya
Filipino-language television shows
GMA Network drama series
Sequel television series
Serial drama television series
Television series reboots
Television shows set in the Philippines